Nabgram is a census town in the Pandabeswar CD block in the Durgapur subdivision of the Paschim Bardhaman district in the Indian state of West Bengal.

Geography

Location

Konardihi, Nabgram, Chak Bankola, Sankarpur, Haripur, Bahula, Chhora and Parashkol form a cluster of census towns in the southern portion of Pandabeswar CD block.

Urbanisation
According to the 2011 census, 79.22% of the population of the Durgapur subdivision was urban and 20.78% was rural. The Durgapur subdivision has 1 municipal corporation at Durgapur and 38 (+1 partly) census towns  (partly presented in the map alongside; all places marked on the map are linked in the full-screen map).

Demographics
According to the 2011 Census of India, Nabgram had a total population of 4,626, of which 2,431 (53%) were males and 2,195 (47%) were females. Population in the age range 0–6 years was 609. The total number of literate persons in Nabgram was 3,032 (75.48% of the population over 6 years).

*For language details see Pandabeswar (community development block)#Language and religion

 India census, Nabgram had a population of 4,643. Males constitute 54% of the population and females 46%. Nabgram has an average literacy rate of 58%, lower than the national average of 59.5%: male literacy is 68%, and female literacy is 46%. In Nabgram, 11% of the population is under 6 years of age.

Infrastructure

According to the District Census Handbook 2011, Bardhaman, Nabgram covered an area of 4.51 km2. Among the civic amenities, the protected water-supply involved service reservoir, tap water from treated sources, uncovered wells. It had 382 domestic electric connections. Among the medical facilities it had were 1 dispensary/ health centre. Among the educational facilities it had were 2 primary schools, other school facilities at Ukhra 3 km away. Among the social, recreational and cultural facilities it had was 1 public library. Among the important commodities it produced were coal, paddy, vegetables.

Economy
As per the ECL website telephone numbers, operational collieries in the Bankola Area of Eastern Coalfields in 2018 are: Bankola Colliery, Khandra Colliery, Kumardih A Colliery, Kumardih B Colliery, Moira Colliery, Nakrakonda Colliery, Shankarpur Colliery, Shyamsundarpur Colliery and Tilaboni Colliery.

Education
Nabgram has three primary schools.

References

Cities and towns in Paschim Bardhaman district